Battle Creek is a city in Ida County, Iowa, United States. The population was 700 at the 2020 census.

History
Battle Creek got its start in the year 1877, following construction of the Chicago and North Western Railway through that territory. It was named after nearby Battle Creek. The town was incorporated in 1880.
It is referenced in the 2011 film Butter as the birthplace of fictional character, Bob Pickler.

Celebrations
Battle Creek holds a Fourth of July celebration every year from July 3 through July 5. In 2015 Battle Creek celebrated its sesquicentennial (150 years) over the July 4th holiday, even though it doesn't reach that milestone until 2027. The slogan for their 150th celebration is Small In Size, Big In Heart which shows how much pride this small town takes in this event. During the celebration there is a parade, fireworks, the Fireman's dance, and you can even enter in the frog jumping contest.

Geography
Battle Creek is located at  (42.316842, -95.599583). It is situated on the Maple River.

Demographics

2010 census
As of the census of 2010, there were 713 people, 325 households, and 178 families residing in the city. The racial makeup of the city was 98.2% White, 0.6% African American, 0.8% Asian, 0.3% from other races, and 0.1% from two or more races. Hispanic or Latino of any race were 1.7% of the population.

There were 325 households, of which 24.9% had children under the age of 18 living with them, 45.8% were married couples living together, 4.6% had a female householder with no husband present, 4.3% had a male householder with no wife present, and 45.2% were non-families. 42.2% of all households were made up of individuals, and 23.3% had someone living alone who was 65 years of age or older. The average household size was 2.11 and the average family size was 2.85.

The median age in the city was 46.3 years. 23% of residents were under the age of 18; 5.6% were between the ages of 18 and 24; 19.9% were from 25 to 44; 24.6% were from 45 to 64; and 26.9% were 65 years of age or older. The gender makeup of the city was 48.1% male and 51.9% female.

2000 census
As of the census of 2000, there were 743 people, 325 households, and 195 families residing in the city. The racial makeup of the city was 99.33% White, 0.13% Asian, 0.13% from other races, and 0.40% from two or more races. Hispanic or Latino of any race were 0.67% of the population.

There were 325 households, out of which 21.2% had children under the age of 18 living with them, 52.9% were married couples living together, 5.2% had a female householder with no husband present, and 39.7% were non-families. 36.9% of all households were made up of individuals, and 23.4% had someone living alone who was 65 years of age or older. The average household size was 2.15 and the average family size was 2.83.

In the city, the population was spread out, with 19.8% under the age of 18, 5.8% from 18 to 24, 18.8% from 25 to 44, 24.0% from 45 to 64, and 31.6% who were 65 years of age or older. The median age was 49 years. For every 100 females, there were 87.6 males. For every 100 females age 18 and over, there were 85.7 males.

The median income for a household in the city was $31,029, and the median income for a family was $39,479. Males had a median income of $25,400 versus $19,931 for females. The per capita income for the city was $16,106. About 3.0% of families and 7.3% of the population were below the poverty line, including 4.8% of those under age 18 and 6.0% of those age 65 or over.

Education
Battle Creek is a part of the Odebolt–Arthur–Battle Creek–Ida Grove Community School District.

It was formerly a part of the Battle Creek–Ida Grove Community School District, which was established in 1994, until its merger with the Odebolt–Arthur Community School District on July 1, 2018. Schools serving the community include OABCIG Elementary Ida Grove in Ida Grove, OABCIG Middle School in Odebolt, and OABCIG High School in Ida Grove.

Notable person 

Ed H. Campbell, U.S. Representative from Iowa

References

Cities in Iowa
Cities in Ida County, Iowa